Jon James Alexander Mellish (born 19 September 1997) is an English professional footballer who plays for Carlisle United, as a defender and midfielder.

Early and personal life
Born in South Shields, Mellish attended Gateshead College.

Career
Mellish began his career with Gateshead, making his senior debut during the 2016–17 season. He moved on loan to Newcastle Benfield in November 2017.

He signed for Carlisle United in May 2019. He scored his first goal for Carlisle in a 1-0 win against Barrow on 3 October 2020. He signed a new contract with the club later that month. He was a prolific scorer for the club in the 2020–21 season.

Playing style
Originally a defender, Mellish was converted into a midfielder in February 2020.

Career statistics

References

1997 births
Living people
English footballers
Association football defenders
Association football midfielders
Gateshead F.C. players
Newcastle Benfield F.C. players
Carlisle United F.C. players
National League (English football) players
English Football League players
Footballers from South Shields